Second Corinth is an unincorporated community in Waller County, Texas, United States.

References

Unincorporated communities in Waller County, Texas
Unincorporated communities in Texas